Psapharoctes is a genus of beetles in the family Cerambycidae, containing the following species:

 Psapharoctes fanchonae Tavakilian & Neouze, 2007
 Psapharoctes hermieri Tavakilian & Neouze, 2007

References

Acanthoderini